Sebastiano Baggio (16 May 1913 – 21 March 1993) was an Italian cardinal, often thought to be a likely candidate for election to the papacy. He served as President of the Pontifical Commission for Vatican City State from 1984 to 1990 and was Prefect of the Sacred Congregation for Bishops from 1973 to 1984.

Early life and priestly ministry
Born in Rosà, Veneto, Sebastiano was ordained a priest on 21 December 1935, at the age of 22, in Vicenza. He took postgraduate studies and joined the Holy See's diplomatic service with the first posting as attaché to the Apostolic nunciature in Austria in 1938.

Episcopal ministry

In 1953 he was consecrated a bishop and given the rank of archbishop. He served as Apostolic Nuncio to Chile from 1953 to 1959; Apostolic Delegate to Canada from 1959 to 1964; and Apostolic Nuncio to Brazil from 1964 to 1969.  Pope Paul VI raised him to the rank of cardinal on 30 April 1969 assigning him as a cardinal deacon the title of Santi Angeli Custodi a Città Giardino. Pope Paul appointed him Archbishop of Cagliari in Sardinia on 23 June 1969.

He was appointed prefect of the Congregation for Bishops on 26 February 1973.

One of the most influential posts he held in Rome - between 1973 and 1984 - was Prefect of the Congregation of Bishops, whose task is to prepare lists of candidates for the episcopacy. One obituary in the London Independent noted that: "though Baggio always insisted that he was not the bishop-maker - he proposed while the Pope alone disposed - he did in effect have considerable powers of patronage. He had immense knowledge of the dossiers of possible candidates, and knew their weaknesses for drink or women.".    He was credited as a talent spotter in furthering the episcopal career of Cardinal Alfonso López Trujillo who shared many of Baggio's concern at the direction of the Church in South America.

The same obituary, written by the respected Catholic journalist Peter Hebblethwaite, drew attention to Baggio's relationship with Opus Dei and his battles with Fr Pedro Arrupe, the Jesuit General, over the future of Central American policy: "Baggio - and Pope John Paul - wanted a 'unitary policy' for Central America which the Jesuits and other religious thought impossible in view of the different situations: civil war in El Salvador, dictatorship in Panama, a post-revolutionary regime in Nicaragua, and a persecuting born-again General in Guatemala."

He participated in the two conclaves of 1978 and when he died in 1993 at Rome at age 79 was both Camerlengo of the Holy Roman Church, and a sub-dean of the College of Cardinals.  He had been a priest for 57 years, a bishop for 39 years, and a cardinal for 23 years. Described as "affable, smiling, squat and somewhat worldly, Baggio was deeply attached to his native Rosà and not only willed that his remains were to be buried in the family tomb but inside the local cemetery."

According to the report from Bishop Ganon in 'the Ganon Report' to Pope Paul IV, pope John-Paul I and pope John-Paul II and in 'Peccorelli's list; Cardinal Baggio was a member of Masonry

References

External links
Catholic Hierarchy
Bishop-maker Baggio is dead

1913 births
1993 deaths
Presidents of the Pontifical Commission for Vatican City State
Participants in the Second Vatican Council
20th-century Italian cardinals
Apostolic Nuncios to Brazil
Apostolic Nuncios to Canada
Apostolic Nuncios to Chile
People from the Province of Vicenza
Pontifical Gregorian University alumni
Pontifical Ecclesiastical Academy alumni
Members of the Congregation for Bishops
Pontifical Commission for Latin America
Camerlengos of the Holy Roman Church
Cardinals created by Pope Paul VI
Patrons of the Sovereign Military Order of Malta